James Chacko was an Indian actor who starred in more than 150 Malayalam language films. He was active for over three decades. He joined the industry as an art and production manager and later was the manager for actor Nedumudi Venu. He played important roles in New Delhi, Meesa Madhavan, Pathram, Oru Maravathoor Kanavu and Peruvannapurathe Visheshangal. The character Pattalam Purushu played by James in the 2002 movie Meesa Madhavan has attained a cult status in Malayalam cinema.

Death

James died following cardiac arrest on 14 June 2007 at his brother's house at Kaduthuruthy.

Filmography

References

External links
 

Male actors in Malayalam cinema
Indian male film actors
Male actors from Thiruvananthapuram
Year of birth missing
2007 deaths
20th-century Indian male actors
21st-century Indian male actors